Lymanske International Airport  is an airport in the Odessa Oblast, Ukraine. It is located 2.5 km east of the town of Lymanske. Originally built as a military airbase, it began service as a public airport in April 1998.

References

External links
General Airport Information
 International airport "Lymans'ke"

Buildings and structures in Odesa Oblast
Airports in Ukraine
Soviet Air Force bases

Ukrainian airbases